Phenoxazine is a heterocyclic compound. The structure of phenoxazine consists of an oxazine fused to two benzene rings.  It occurs as the central core of a number of naturally occurring chemical compounds such as dactinomycin and litmus. The dyes Nile blue and Nile red are also based on a phenoxazine core.

Phenoxazine dyes were once widely used for silk dyeing, but due to their lack of lightfastness they have disappeared over time from the market. However, since their light resistance is significantly better on acrylic fibers, these dyes have experienced a renaissance.

See also 
Phenothiazine

References